USS YMS-50 was a United States Navy  auxiliary motor minesweeper during World War II. Laid down on 16 July 1941 at Wheeler Shipbuilding Corp., Whitestone, Long Island, New York, she was launched on 6 June 1942 and commissioned on 3 August. Assigned to the South West Pacific Area she was damaged by a dive bomber while covering the landings during the battle of Arawe, New Britain on 17 December 1943.

Citations

References

 

YMS-1-class minesweepers of the United States Navy
Ships built in Queens, New York
World War II minesweepers of the United States
1941 ships
Ships sunk by mines
Maritime incidents in June 1945